Craig Michael Bjornson (born February 14, 1969) is an American former professional baseball player and coach who was most recently the bullpen coach for the New York Mets of Major League Baseball (MLB). Bjornson previously coached for the Houston Astros and Boston Red Sox.

Career
Bjornson attended Tucson High School in Tucson, Arizona, and Nicholls State University, where he played college baseball for the Nicholls State Colonels baseball team. He signed as an undrafted free agent with the Houston Astros in 1991. He played in the Astros' minor league organization as a pitcher until 1993, pitching for the Gulf Coast Astros, Burlington Astros, Asheville Tourists, Auburn Astros, and Quad Cities River Bandits. In total, he had a 9-18 win–loss record with a 3.82 earned run average in 81 appearances (27 starts) with a complete game and three saves.

Bjornson served as a minor league pitching coach for the Spokane Indians in 2002 (Royals), the Vermont Lake Monsters in 2003 (Expos) and 2005 (Nationals), the Brevard County Manatees in 2004 (Expos), the Ogden Raptors in 2007 and 2008 (Dodgers), and the Casper Ghosts from 2009 through 2011 (Rockies).

From 2000 through 2003, he coached for the Occidente Pastora de los Llanos of the Venezuelan Winter League.

The Astros hired Bjornson as their bullpen coach for the 2012 season. Following the hiring of Bo Porter as manager for the 2013 season, Bjornson was reassigned as a roving pitching instructor and replaced as bullpen coach by Dennis Martínez. The Astros reinstated Bjornson as their bullpen coach for the 2014 season. Bjornson served as the bullpen coach for the Astros during the 2017 season, when they won their first World Series title.

On November 12, 2017, the Boston Red Sox hired Bjornson as their bullpen coach. In October 2020, the team declined to renew his contract.

On January 21, 2022, Bjornson was hired by New York Mets as the bullpen coach.

References

External links

1969 births
Living people
Baseball pitchers
Baseball players from Tucson, Arizona
Baseball coaches from Arizona
Tucson High School alumni
Asheville Tourists players
Auburn Astros players
Burlington Astros players
Gulf Coast Astros players
Nicholls Colonels baseball players
Quad Cities River Bandits players
Minor league baseball coaches
Major League Baseball bullpen coaches
Houston Astros coaches
Boston Red Sox coaches
New York Mets coaches